, is a female Japanese comedy duo (kombi) active from 1993 to 2013 who were also popular television talents and appeared frequently on Japanese variety shows.

The two comedians, Tomoko Nakajima (中島 知子), and Nahomi Matsushima (松嶋 尚美), are sometimes known as "Black" and "White" Othello, respectively, because Nakajima has darker skin than Matsushima. According to the Japanese Othello page, their duo name comes not only from their contrasting complexions, but also their personality roles, with Nakajima having the darker, more scheming character, and Matsushima playing the innocent boke role in the manzai pattern.

The duo stopped activities in 2011 and officially disbanded in 2013.

Members 
 Tomoko Nakajima
 Date of Birth: August 26, 1971
 Birthplace: Yamashina-ku, Kyoto
 Manzai Role: Tsukkomi 

 Nahomi Matsushima
 Date of Birth: December 2, 1971
 Birthplace: Higashiōsaka, Osaka
 Manzai Role: Boke

See also 
 Owarai
 Manzai

References

External links 
 
 Othello official profile on Shochiku Geino website

Japanese comedy duos